"Taking the Veil" is a song by the English singer-songwriter David Sylvian. It is the first single released in support of his album Gone to Earth.

The song's title was inspired by Sylvian's encounter with the Max Ernst collage novel A Little Girl Dreams of Taking the Veil. However, whereas Ernst's volume deals with various forms of angst undergone by its main character, the lyrics to Sylvian's song are much more positive.

Chart positions

References

1986 songs
1986 singles
David Sylvian songs
Songs written by David Sylvian
Virgin Records singles